Lycopus (water horehound, gypsywort, or bugleweed) is a genus in the family Lamiaceae. They are all herbaceous plants native to Europe, Asia, Australia, and North America. The species are most often found in wetlands, damp meadows, and stream banks. Some of the wetland species have become endangered.

Appearance
The genus includes only perennial species; they spread by both seeds and stems rooting as they grow along the ground. Small white flowers bloom in late summer on leaf axials. Leaves are bright green, pointed, lobed, and like all mints occur in opposite pairs. Some species start with curled purple leaves that unfurl to a bright green coloration.

Ethnobotanical history
The plant's juice yields black dye, supposedly used by the Roma in Europe to tan their skin to mimic Egyptians, hence the common name of Gypsywort for Lycopus europaeus. Apothecaries and herbalists used the leaves, stems, and flowers for their astringent and sedative qualities as well as for anxiety, tuberculosis, and palpitations.

Fossil record
Fossil seeds of †Lycopus antiquus are known from the Middle Miocene strata of southern Russia, from the Miocene of Lower Lusatia, Germany, and from the Late Miocene strata of western Siberia and Ukraine. Extant Lycopus species whose fruits most resemble L. antiquus, are the East Asian Lycopus lucidus and the Eurasian Lycopus  exaltatus.

Species

Lycopus alissoviae Prob. – Primorye region of Russia
Lycopus americanus Muhl. ex W.P.C.Barton – American bugleweed - widespread across most of United States and Canada
Lycopus amplectens Raf. – eastern United States
Lycopus angustifolius Elliott – southeastern United States
Lycopus asper Greene – rough bugleweed - western Canada, western + central United States
Lycopus australis  R.Br. – Australian Gypsywort - Australia
Lycopus cavaleriei H.Lév. – Korean bugleweed - China, Japan, Korea, Sakhalin, Kuril Islands
Lycopus charkeviczii Prob. – Primorye region of Russia
Lycopus cokeri H.E.Ahles ex Sorrie – North Carolina, South Carolina
Lycopus europaeus L. – Gypsywort - Europe, North Africa, northern Asia; naturalized in New Zealand and North America
Lycopus exaltatus L.f. – central + eastern Europe, Siberia, Central Asia, Xinjiang, Caucasus, Western Himalayas
Lycopus hirtellus Kom. – Primorye region of Russia
Lycopus × intermedius Hausskn. – Germany, Austria, Czech Republic, Greece  (L. europaeus × L. exaltatus)
Lycopus kurilensis Prob. – Kuril Islands
Lycopus laurentianus Roll.-Germ. – Quebec
Lycopus lucidus Turcz. ex Benth. – Traditional Chinese Medicine herb to make Lycopi rhizoma - China, Japan, Korea, Siberia, Russian Far East
Lycopus rubellus Moench – central + eastern United States
Lycopus × sherardii Steele – Quebec, Ontario, eastern United States
Lycopus sichotensis Prob. – Primorye region of Russia
Lycopus uniflorus Michx. – northern bugleweed - Canada, United States. China, Japan, Korea, Russian Far East
Lycopus virginicus L. – Virginia bugleweed/water-horehound - central + eastern United States

References

 
Lamiaceae genera
Taxa named by Carl Linnaeus